Noûs is a quarterly peer-reviewed academic journal on philosophy published by Wiley-Blackwell. It was established in 1967 by Hector-Neri Castañeda and is currently edited by Ernest Sosa (Rutgers University). The journal is accompanied by two annual supplements, Philosophical Issues and Philosophical Perspectives.

See also 
List of philosophy journals

External links 
 

Philosophy journals
Wiley-Blackwell academic journals
Contemporary philosophical literature
Quarterly journals
English-language journals
Publications established in 1967